Keli Kottu is a 1990 Indian Malayalam film, directed and produced by T. S. Mohan. The film stars Devan and Shari in the lead roles. The film has musical score by Rajamani.

Cast
Devan
Shari
Sathaar
Karan
Charan Raj

Soundtrack
The music was composed by Rajamani and the lyrics were written by Mankombu Gopalakrishnan.

References

External links
 

1990 films
1990s Malayalam-language films